Flóra Gondos (born 11 April 1992) is a Hungarian diver. She competed in the 3 m springboard at the 2012 Summer Olympics.

References

External links
Sports Reference

1992 births
Living people
Divers at the 2012 Summer Olympics
Olympic divers of Hungary
Hungarian female divers
20th-century Hungarian women
21st-century Hungarian women